Sander Petrus Henricus van der Weide (born 21 June 1976 in Boxtel, North Brabant) is a field hockey player from the Netherlands, who was a member of the Dutch team that won the golden medal at the 2000 Summer Olympics in Sydney.

The defender made his debut on 13 November 1996 in a friendly against Germany in Eindhoven. He played in the Dutch League for HC Den Bosch and Amsterdam, before moving to Spain in the summer of 2004, just after the 2004 Summer Olympics in Athens, where he won the silver medal with the national squad. Since then Van der Weide played for Real Club de Polo in Barcelona.

His cousin Jeroen Delmee was the captain of the Dutch national side since 2000.

Sander lives and works in Barcelona with his wife and two kids. Here he started his own business in hockey events, The Hockey Department.

External links

 Dutch Hockey Federation

1976 births
Living people
Dutch male field hockey players
Male field hockey defenders
1998 Men's Hockey World Cup players
Field hockey players at the 2000 Summer Olympics
2002 Men's Hockey World Cup players
Field hockey players at the 2004 Summer Olympics
2006 Men's Hockey World Cup players
Field hockey players at the 2008 Summer Olympics
Olympic field hockey players of the Netherlands
Olympic gold medalists for the Netherlands
Olympic silver medalists for the Netherlands
People from Boxtel
Sportspeople from North Brabant
Olympic medalists in field hockey
Medalists at the 2004 Summer Olympics
Amsterdamsche Hockey & Bandy Club players
HC Den Bosch players
Real Club de Polo de Barcelona players
Dutch expatriate sportspeople in Spain
Expatriate field hockey players
Medalists at the 2000 Summer Olympics